Air Officer Commanding (AOC) is a title given in the air forces of Commonwealth (and some other) nations to an air officer who holds a command appointment which typically comprises a large, organized collection of air force assets. Thus, an air vice marshal might be the AOC 38 Group. The equivalent term for army officers is general officer commanding (GOC), from where the air force term was derived.

An air officer heading a particularly large or important command may be called an air officer commanding-in-chief (AOC-in-C).

Royal Air Force usage
In the RAF those air officers who command a group are styled air officer commanding, followed by the name of the group.  Currently, there are five AOCs:
 AOC 1 Group
 AOC 2 Group
 AOC 11 Group
 AOC 22 Group
 AOC 83 Group

This title is also used for the appointment of the United Kingdom Air Component Commander in the Middle East, who is dual-hatted as AOC 83 Expeditionary Air Group.

Indian Air Force usage
In the IAF, Officers of the rank of Air Commodore who command Wings, Base Repair Depots, Equipment Depots and Air Bases are styled as Air Officer Commanding (AOC). Similarly, Air Vice Marshals commanding Groups (like the J&K Group & Maritime Air Ops Group) and Advance Headquarters are styled as Air Officer Commanding (AOC).

Senior Air Marshals who command the Seven Air Commands are styled as Air Officer Commanding-in-Chief (AOC-in-C). The Seven appointments are : 
 Air Officer Commanding-in-Chief Central Air Command 
 Air Officer Commanding-in-Chief Eastern Air Command
 Air Officer Commanding-in-Chief Southern Air Command 
 Air Officer Commanding-in-Chief South Western Air Command 
 Air Officer Commanding-in-Chief Western Air Command
 Air Officer Commanding-in-Chief Training Command
 Air Officer Commanding-in-Chief Maintenance Command

United States Air Force usage

In the United States Air Force, the term "Air Officer Commanding" is used specifically to refer to the specially selected officers who command cadet squadrons and groups at the United States Air Force Academy in Colorado Springs, Colorado.  In the case of a cadet squadron, the AOC is normally a major; in the case of a cadet group, the AOC is normally a lieutenant colonel. These officers exercise command authority over their cadet units and are expected to train cadets in officership and military matters, advise the cadets who hold leadership positions in the unit, and act as role models for the future officers.

Although the vast majority of AOCs at the academy are, logically, United States Air Force officers, a small number may come from the other U.S. military branches, at least one from each of the other three branches at a given point in time.  While holding these positions at the academy, these officers are still referred to as "Air Officers Commanding" despite their being Army, Navy or Marine officers who may or may not be aviators.

References

Royal Air Force appointments
Indian military appointments
+